Phyllidia scottjohnsoni is a species of sea slug, a dorid nudibranch, a shell-less marine gastropod mollusk in the family Phyllidiidae.

Distribution 
This species was described from the Hawaiian Islands.

Description
This nudibranch has a partly translucent, white dorsum with large round black spots. There are small, scattered, tubercles all over the back.

Diet
This species feeds on a sponge.

References

Phyllidiidae
Gastropods described in 1993